"Automatic Lover (Call for Love)" is a song by German Eurodance/pop music project Real McCoy (also known as M.C. Sar & The Real McCoy), released in 1994 as the second single from their album, Another Night (1995), which is the US version of the project's second album Space Invaders. The song was produced by music producers Juergen Wind (aka J. Wind) and Frank Hassas (aka Quickmix) under the producer team name Freshline, and borrows the melody from Bronski Beat's 1984 song, "Smalltown Boy". It was a top 20 hit in a number of countries including Australia, Denmark, Germany and Sweden.

Critical reception
Bradley Torreano from AllMusic felt the song "was more club-friendly and found its audience among the young dance crowds before moving to radio." Larry Flick from Billboard wrote, "Look for this Euro-NRG trio to once again steamroll toward the upper regions of the Hot 100 with this catchy dance/pop ditty. The formula is solidly in place: Throaty Romeo-style male rapping is balanced by charming female vamping during the chorus and underscored with frenetic, butt-shaking beats. The hook is as sticky as they come. A no-brainer hit." 

Dave Sholin from the Gavin Report commented, "Tally up the spins that O-Jay, Patsy and Vanessa have logged in the States since the release of "Another Night" and it's nothing short of staggering. That figure is certain to grow thanks to this high-energy production." Another editor, Annette M. Lai, felt it has "hit potential". Howard Cohen from Herald-Journal described the track as "club-ready". Daisy and Havoc from Music Weeks RM Dance Update declared it as a "amusing piece of pop". Another editor, James Hamilton, called it a "archetypal gruffy muttered and sweetly cooed Euro romp". A reviewer from People Magazine felt that songs like this "pack so many beats into 4 minutes that just listening to them is thoroughly exhausting."

Chart performance
While the single ultimately failed to match the massive success of "Another Night," "Run Away" and "Come and Get Your Love", it still managed to reach number two in Finland, and the top 20 spot in Australia (18), Denmark (14), Germany (20) and Sweden (19). In the UK, it peaked at number 58 in its first week at the UK Singles Chart, on November 5, 1995. But on the UK Dance Chart, it fared better, peaking at number 20. The song also peaked at number nine on the RPM Dance/Urban chart in Canada. On the Eurochart Hot 100, it reached number 44 in March 1994.

Music video
There were made two different music videos for "Automatic Lover (Call for Love)". The European version was directed by Angel in 1994. The US version appeared in late of 1995 and was later published by Vevo on YouTube in October 2009. As of January 2023, it had amassed more than 12 million views. The European version was published in October 2006.

Track listing
 CD single (Hansa – 74321 18487 2) "Automatic Lover (Call for Love)" (Radio Mix) – 3:47
 "Automatic Lover (Call for Love)" (Extended 12" Mix) – 5:30
 "Automatic Lover (Call for Love)" (Trans Euro Mix) – 5:27
 "Automatic Lover (Call for Love)" (Automatic Trance Mix) – 5:47

 The Remixes (Hansa – 74321 20460 2) "Automatic Lover (Call for Love)" (Airplay Remix) – 3:58
 "Automatic Lover (Call for Love)" (Maximum Mix) – 4:53
 "Automatic Lover (Call for Love)" (B & B Mix) – 5:48
 "Automatic Lover (Call for Love)" (Party Rave Mix) – 5:34
 "Automatic Lover (Call for Love)" (Garage Mix) – 5:40
 "Automatic Lover (Call for Love)" (Call For Hardcore Mix) – 5:34

 Dutch maxi single (Hansa – 74321 32574 1)'
 "Automatic Lover (Call for Love)" (Lenny's House Mix Edit) – 7:56
 "Automatic Lover (Call for Love)" (Trans Euro Mix) – 5:27
 "Automatic Lover (Call for Love)" (Armand's NYC-Miami Mix) – 9:37

Charts

Weekly charts

Year-end charts

References

1993 songs
1994 singles
Arista Records singles
English-language German songs
Music videos directed by Angel (director)
Real McCoy (band) songs
Songs written by Jürgen Wind